Levski is a town in central northern Bulgaria, an administrative center of the homonymous Levski Municipality in the very southeast of Pleven Province.

Geography 
Levski Municipality is located on a territory of 414 km2 in the Danubian plain, Tuchenishko-Dolnoosomski region. The predominant relief in the municipality is the plain relief - the town of Levski is located at about 70 m above sea level. The distance to the regional town of Pleven is 50 km. The climate is temperate continental.

History 
The old name of Levski (until 1897) is Karaagach (from Turkish - Black Elm). Today's Levski station before the Liberation from Ottoman rule was inhabited mainly by Turks. Some called it Turkish Karaach, unlike the village of Bulgarian Karaach, today's Totleben.

In 1880 there were 1,082 inhabitants in Turkish Karaach. Six years after the Liberation, in 1884 a primary school was opened, and in 1887 a Bulgarian church was built.

In 1881, the government of Dragan Tsankov proposed in the National Assembly to study the construction of the railway line Sofia - Danube. With a law of 15 February 1883, construction began. At that time the railway junction Levski station was also built.

The line was officially opened by Knyaz Ferdinand on 8 November 1899 with the starting station Sofia - Roman - Pleven - Gorna Oryahovitsa - Shumen - Varna.

The village of Karaach at that time was inconspicuous, covered in mud, the houses small and unstable. In no way could it be compared with the settlements close to it, such as Letnitsa, Alexandrovo and others.

In 1945, a year after the September 9 coup d'état, the village of Levski became the first village in Bulgaria to be declared a city by the communist authorities. OTKZS "Komuna" was founded in the city.

Religion 
The city and the municipality are inhabited by Orthodox, Catholics, Muslims and Evangelicals. There is a Catholic parish "St. John XXIII" in the town, and in the municipality there are several Catholic villages (Malchika, Tranchovitsa).

Economy 
The town of Levski is a large transport hub - from the main line Sofia - Varna, here the trains make a connection to Troyan and Lovech, Svishtov. Two third-class, but very busy republican highways pass through the town - (in general as directions) - Svishtov - Levski - Lovech - Troyan and Nikopol - Levski - Pavlikeni - Veliko Tarnovo. 8 km north of Levski passes the first class road Sofia - (Ruse) - Varna. The route of the future Hemus highway will pass ten kilometers south of Levski.

The traditional for the Municipality of Levski, very well developed, food, machine building and light industry, experienced a difficult period after the entry of market relations in Bulgaria. Since about 2000, there has been a revival in the economy. The investments of both the local business and the external companies operating on the territory of the municipality are increasing.

ESMOS AD - a machine-building plant specializing in the production of machines for processing and recycling of plastics - has excellent positions and an expanding market niche. With its many years of experience, significant production base and high capacity, with qualified and competent staff, certified according to international standards ISO 2001: 2008, ISO 14001: 2004 and OHSAS 18001: 2007, the company is a leader in the production of machines for separation and recycling of Balkan Peninsula.

The prosperous Bultrex Ltd. / sale and service of agricultural machinery / continues to expand its activity. There is investor interest in the construction of processing plants and other industries. It ceased its activities in 2012.

Opposite the station is "KIP" -Levski. This is an enterprise from the structure of the National Company "Railway Infrastructure". Established on 1 July 1977, during its 30-year history it has developed successfully as a metrological centre. Here is performed repair of devices from speedometer installation of locomotives, inspection of measuring instruments, production of spare parts for locomotives.

Assessing the advantages of the town of Levski as a location and communications, since 2008 a joint investment of Silvamash (Bulgaria) and the Swedish giant IKEA has been realized not far from the railway station.

Culture

Institutions 
 Community centre „Georgi Partsalev“
 Town's newspaper – „LEVSKI dnes“
 Community centre „Prosveta“ – founded in 1901

Education 
There are 5 education centres. Two high schools and three primary schools.

Landmarks 
 Vasil Levski monument
 Old stone bridge – „Roman bridge“
 Forest park „Shavarna“
 Memorial plaque of Khan Kubrat with soil from his grave

Museums 
 Museum house of Georgi Partsalev
 Small ethnographic museum to PGSS school Nikola Yonkov Vaptsarov

Events 
 July 18 - City holiday
 Every Saturday - market day
 Last Saturday and Sunday in August - fair

Notable people 
 Georgi Partsalev – actor
 Vasil Marinov – writer and journalist
 Kamen Asenov – actor
 Nikola Nikolov – writer and journalist
 Todor Nikolov – academic and doctor
 Aneta Todorova – journalist and publisher
 Galya Topcheva – equestrian athlete
 Veselina Genovska – writer
 Krum Popov – mayor of Sofia (1892–1923)
 Doncho Tsonchev – writer
 Lyudmila Radkova – writer
 Vladimir Ivanov – doctor and public figure
 Ivan Ivanov – writer
 Iliya and Georgi Milanovi – footballers
 Grigor Vachkov – actor
 Mihail Genovski – jurist and politician
 Lilyana Rachkova – socialist labour hero
 Borislav Nikolov – engineer, entrepreneur
 Ana-Maria Yanakieva – singer

References

External links
 Website of Levski
 Levski at Domino.bg

Towns in Bulgaria
Populated places in Pleven Province